Winthrop is a very small village located on the southeastern part of Huron County, Ontario, Canada, where two county roads meet.  It is within the Municipality of Huron East.

Winthrop used to have a few shops, a general store, and a post office.

References

Communities in Huron County, Ontario